Dansam (also known as K13) is a  mountain peak in the west of the Saltoro Mountains, part of Karakorum Range.

Location 
Dansam is located in the disputed border region between the Pakistani territory of Gilgit-Baltistan (the former Northern Territories) and the Indian Kashmir region to the south-west of the Siachen Glacier. The mountain forms the highest peak of a ridge that runs between the river valleys of Kondus in the northwest and Dansam river in the south and east. The peak is located almost 24 km south-southwest of the Saltoro Kangri , the highest point of the Saltoro Mountains, and 21 km west of the Chumik Kangri , which is the dominance reference point.

Climbing history 
No ascents of Dansam Peak are documented.

External links 

 Karte, himalaya-info.org

References 

Mountains of the Karakoram
Wikipedia requested photographs by location